Insulasaurus victoria is a species of skink. It is endemic to Palawan in the Philippines.

References

Insulasaurus
Reptiles of the Philippines
Endemic fauna of the Philippines
Fauna of Palawan
Reptiles described in 1980
Taxa named by Angel Chua Alcala
Taxa named by Walter Creighton Brown